Markarfljót is a river in the south of Iceland. It is approximately 100 kilometers long.

The Markarfljót rises in the Rauðafossafjöll  massif, east of the volcano Hekla. The main sources for the river are the glaciers Mýrdalsjökull and Eyjafjallajökull. It flows through narrow gorges in the mountainous area between the glaciers Tindfjallajökull and Torfajökull, then spreads in the wide sandur plains at Iceland's south coast, near Þórsmörk. The Markarfljót takes its course first north, then west of Þórsmörk and finally empties into the Atlantic west of Eyjafjallajökull.

One of the Markarfljót's tributaries is the river Krossá , flowing through Þórsmörk, which is notorious for sudden changes in its water level.

The first bridge over the river was opened in 1934 near Litli Dímon . It is 242 meters long and was at the time the longest bridge in Iceland. A second bridge was built in 1978 at Emstrur . A third bridge was opened in 1992 a few kilometers south of the first bridge.

References 

Rivers of Iceland
Southern Region (Iceland)